Hyde Park is a census-designated place just outside the city of Reading in Muhlenberg Township, Berks County, Pennsylvania, United States. As of the 2010 census, the population was 2,528 residents.

References

Census-designated places in Berks County, Pennsylvania
Census-designated places in Pennsylvania